Mathilde Panot (born 15 January 1989) is a French politician who has presided over the La France Insoumise group in the National Assembly since 2021. She was elected to the French National Assembly on 18 June 2017, representing the department of Val-de-Marne.

Panot was the coordinator for FI support groups during the 2017 French presidential election.

See also
 2017 French legislative election
 2022 French legislative election

References

1989 births
Living people
Deputies of the 15th National Assembly of the French Fifth Republic
La France Insoumise politicians
Women members of the National Assembly (France)
21st-century French women politicians
Politicians from Tours, France
Sciences Po alumni
Deputies of the 16th National Assembly of the French Fifth Republic